Alf Copsey (22 January 1921 – 7 March 1996) was an Australian rules footballer who played for the Melbourne Football Club and St Kilda Football Club in the Victorian Football League (VFL).

Notes

External links 

1921 births
Australian rules footballers from Victoria (Australia)
Melbourne Football Club players
St Kilda Football Club players
Sandringham Football Club players
1996 deaths